Valentín de la Cruz (1928 – 11 June 2021) was a Spanish monk and historian. He was a member of the Real Academia de Bellas Artes de San Fernando.

References 

1928 births
2021 deaths
Carmelites
Spanish monks
20th-century Spanish historians
Academic staff of the National University of Distance Education
People from the Province of Burgos